Henry Spoors Oliver (16 February 1921 – 11 January 1994) was an English professional footballer. He played at full back and centre half in the Football League for Hartlepools United, Brentford and Watford. He also played competitive football for Houghton Colliery Welfare and Canterbury City and represented England as a schoolboy.

Career

Born in Sunderland, Oliver played for the England schoolboys team, as well as for Houghton Colliery Welfare. He joined Hartlepools United—then in the Football League Third Division North—as a 16-year-old, and turned professional shortly after his 17th birthday. However, he did not remain there for long; after only 9 league games Oliver transferred to Brentford, who at the time were in the First Division, in 1938 for a £1500 fee. Unfortunately for Oliver, the Football League was suspended in 1939 due to the Second World War, and did not resume until 1946. During this period he played guest wartime football for Leeds United and York City.

In the first two seasons following the resumption of peacetime football, Oliver made 18 league appearances for Brentford. He transferred to Watford for a fee of £2,000 in May 1948, although Benskins brewery paid the money on Watford's behalf. Under the management of Eddie Hapgood, Ron Gray and Haydn Green, Oliver made 122 Watford appearances in the Third Division South, and a further 6 in the FA Cup, scoring four penalties. He joined Canterbury City at the end of the 1951–52 season, and remained there until his retirement in 1956.

Oliver died in the city of his birth on 11 January 1994, aged 72.

Personal life 
Oliver served in the Merchant Navy during the Second World War.

References

1921 births
1994 deaths
Footballers from Sunderland
English footballers
Hartlepool United F.C. players
Brentford F.C. players
Watford F.C. players
Canterbury City F.C. players
Leeds United F.C. wartime guest players
York City F.C. wartime guest players
English Football League players
British Merchant Navy personnel of World War II
Sunderland A.F.C. players
Sheffield United F.C. players
Association football wing halves
Association football fullbacks